Adam Bob (October 30, 1967 – July 16, 2019) was an American professional football player who played as a linebacker in the National Football League (NFL). He was drafted in the tenth round of the 1989 NFL Draft by the New York Jets and played that season with the team.

References

Players of American football from Milwaukee
Montreal Machine players
New York Jets players
American football linebackers
Texas A&M Aggies football players
1967 births
2019 deaths
African-American players of American football
Deaths from liver disease